The Martyrdom of Saint Bartholomew is a painting by the Naples-based Spanish artist Jusepe de Ribera, produced between 1630 and 1640 and now in the Galleria Palatina of the Uffizi in Florence.

Sources
http://www.culturaitalia.it/opencms/museid/viewItem.jsp?language=it&id=oai%3Aculturaitalia.it%3Amuseiditalia-work_64167
https://www.ft.com/content/a56eabba-bc1b-11e8-8274-55b72926558f

1630s paintings
Paintings in the collection of the Uffizi
Paintings by Jusepe de Ribera
Paintings about death
Torture in art
Paintings of Bartholomew the Apostle